Aliou Badara Baldé (born 12 December 2002) is a Senegalese professional footballer who plays as a winger for Swiss club FC Lausanne-Sport.

Club career
On 19 January 2021, Baldé signed a professional contract with Feyenoord. He made his professional debut with Feyenoord in a 1–1 Eredivisie tie with FC Emmen on 20 March 2021.

On 7 January 2022, Baldé was loaned to Waasland-Beveren in Belgium. On 31 August 2022, he was loaned to Dordrecht. On 31 January 2023, Baldé was recalled from his loan at FC Dordrecht and moved to Swiss club FC Lausanne-Sport.

International career
Baldé represented the Senegal U17s at the 2019 FIFA U-17 World Cup.

References

External links
 
 Diambars Profile

2002 births
Living people
People from Ziguinchor
Senegalese footballers
Senegal youth international footballers
Association football wingers
Feyenoord players
S.K. Beveren players
FC Dordrecht players
Eredivisie players
Challenger Pro League players
Senegalese expatriate footballers
Senegalese expatriate sportspeople in the Netherlands
Expatriate footballers in the Netherlands
Senegalese expatriate sportspeople in Belgium
Expatriate footballers in Belgium